Flapjack may refer to:

Food
 Flapjack (oat bar), a sweet tray-baked bar in British and Commonwealth cuisine
 Pancake, a flat cake made from batter, sometimes known as a "flapjack"

Organisms
 Flapjack lobster (Ibacus peronii), a crustacean that lives in shallow waters around Australia
 Flapjack octopus (Opisthoteuthis californiana), a deep-sea mollusc
 Flapjack (plant) (Kalanchoe thyrsiflora), native to South Africa

Entertainment
 The animated series The Marvelous Misadventures of Flapjack

Other uses
 Flapjack River, a tributary of Mattawa Bay of the Gouin Reservoir in La Tuque, Quebec, Canada
 Flying Flapjack, nickname of the Vought XF5U experimental U.S. Navy World War II aircraft

See also
 Flapjax, a computer programming language